José María Barril Aguado (born 25 April 1992) is a Spanish football player who currently plays for UD San Sebastián de los Reyes in the Segunda División B.

Career
Barril played youth soccer with Real Madrid from seven years old and spent time with the club's 3rd team Real Madrid C between 2011 and 2013 despite having grown up in an Atlético de Madrid family.

After his release from Real Madrid, Barril spent two weeks with third-tier Spanish club Ontinyent CF, before signing with third-tier United States club Harrisburg City Islanders of the USL Pro.

After two seasons with Oklahoma City Energy, Barrill and Oklahoma mutually agreed to terminate his contract on 22 January 2019. He returned to Spain to sign for Segunda División B side Coruxo FC.

References

External links
 City Islanders bio
 

1992 births
Living people
Footballers from Madrid
Spanish footballers
Association football wingers
Association football midfielders
Segunda División B players
Real Madrid C footballers
Ontinyent CF players
Coruxo FC players
UD San Sebastián de los Reyes players
USL Championship players
Penn FC players
OKC Energy FC players
Spanish expatriate footballers
Spanish expatriate sportspeople in the United States
Expatriate soccer players in the United States